Rachel Galinne (Rachel S. Gluchowicz; Hebrew: רחל גלעין; born 7 February 1949) is an Israeli composer.

Life and career
Rachel Galinne was born in Stockholm, Sweden. She graduated from Uppsala University with a Bachelor of Arts degree in 1974 and then studied composition with Leon Schidlowsky at the Rubin Academy at Tel Aviv University, where she graduated with a Bachelor of Music degree in 1984 and a Master of Music degree in 1988. She also studied composition with Witold Lutoslawski in France, and attended Darmstadt.

After completing her studies, she worked as a composer. In 1994 she received the Prime Minister's Prize for Composers and the ACUM Prize.

Discography
Galinne has issued the following CD albums available at the Israel Music Institute:

Rachel Galinne (1999)
Prisms (2004)
I Will Walk in the Land of the Living (2008)
A Voice Crieth in the Wilderness (2011)

Works
Selected works include:
Islossning, 2 pianoforte, percussion, 1984
Cycles, 1986
Concerto, 2 pianoforte, orchestra, 1988
Trio, cl, va, pianoforte, 1989
Symphony no.1, 1996
Symphony no.2, 1998
Uneginotai Nenagen [And We Shall Sing my Song of Praise] (Isaiah xxxviii), 16-pt mixed chorus, 1993
Amitai in memoriam, for string quartet	
And They Shall Study War no More, for soprano, horn & piano
Aphrodite, for flute solo			
Chamber Symphony, for chamber ensemble	
Chen, for percussion solo & chamber ensemble	
Dybuk, for Solo Clarinet		
Ethalech be'artsot hachayim (I Will Walk in the Land of the Living)for soprano and chamber ensemble
Fugue for String Quartet	
Lo Yisa Goy el Goy Cherev, Nation Shall Not Lift up Sword Against Nation, for Vocal & Instrumental Ensemble	
Sonatat ha-Or (Sonata of Light), for Violin and Piano
The Story of Bellet for tenor & three instruments		
Trio Energico for violin, cello and piano
Kol Kore Bamidbar (A Voice Crieth in the Wilderness) for violin and piano
Mahleriana for violin, viola, cello and piano

References

External links
Rachel Galinne at National Library of Israel

1949 births
20th-century classical composers
Jewish classical composers
Living people
Israeli music educators
Swedish classical composers
Uppsala University alumni
Women classical composers
Swedish Jews
Swedish women composers
Women music educators
20th-century women composers
20th-century Swedish women